The Taiheiyo montane deciduous forests ecoregion (WWF ID: PA0441) stretches for about  along the eastern (Pacific side) slopes of the island of Honshu, with some small patches on the southern islands of Shikoku and Kyushu.  Lower elevations to the east along the coast are in the Taiheiyo evergreen forests ecoregion; higher elevations to the west are in the Nihonkai montane deciduous forests ecoregion.  Characteristic forests are of Japanese beech, stone pine, and spruce.

Location and description 
While most of the ecoregion is represented by a thin strip above the coastal region, there is a large inland section centered on the Akaishi Mountains in central Honshu, and another centered on Fukushima Prefecture to the north.

Climate
The climate of the ecoregion is Humid continental climate, warm summer (Köppen climate classification (Dfb)).

Flora and fauna
Other trees include the Japanese stone pine (Pinus pumila) and Hemlock spruce (Picea). Typical understory is the Saga plant. Large mammals in the ecoregion includes the Japanese serow, Sika deer, and Wild boar.

Protected areas
Protected areas in the ecoregion include:
 Minami Alps National Park, a rugged area in the Akaishi Mountains of central Honshu, with many peaks over 3,000 meters.
 (Portions of) Fuji-Hakone-Izu National Park, in the mainland portions below Mount Fuji, which itself is in the Honshu alpine conifer forests ecoregion where it rises above the surrounding Taiheiyo ecoregion.

References

Palearctic ecoregions
Ecoregions of Japan
Temperate broadleaf and mixed forests
Montane forests